Life During Wartime may refer to:

Music
"Life During Wartime" (song), a song by Talking Heads first released in 1979
"Life During Wartime", a song by Pinhead Gunpowder from their 1997 album Goodbye Ellston Avenue

Film and television
The Alarmist, a 1997 film also known by the alternate title of the Keith Reddin play Life During Wartime upon which it was based
Life During Wartime (Grey's Anatomy), an episode of Grey's Anatomy aired in 2008
Life During Wartime (film), a 2009 film from director Todd Solondz

Literature and drama
Life During Wartime (novel), a 1987 science fantasy novel by Lucius Shepard
Life During Wartime (play), a play written in 1991 by Keith Reddin
Life During Wartime (anthology), a 2003 collection of short stories by various authors about Bernice Summerfield, a character in the Doctor Who franchise